John Putch (born July 27, 1961) is an American actor and filmmaker. He is best known for his recurring role as Bob Morton on the 1970s sitcom One Day at a Time and as Sean Brody in the film Jaws 3-D.

Life and career
Putch was born in Chambersburg, Pennsylvania. He began his career as an actor at the age of five in summer theater company, The Totem Pole Playhouse, run by his father William H. Putch (1924–1983). He is the son of actress Jean Stapleton (1923–2013).

After guest starring on his mother's series All in the Family (playing a Boy Scout in 1973 episode "Archie Is Branded"), he was remembered by producer Norman Lear who cast him in a recurring role as Bob Morton on the sitcom One Day at a Time, appearing in 14 episodes from 1976–1983. Putch's next notable role was in the film Jaws 3-D (1983) co-starring as Sean Brody the son of Roy Scheider's character, Martin Brody, and his other film credits include appearances in The Sure Thing (1985), Welcome to 18 (1986), Men at Work (1990), Skeeter (1993), and the horror film Curfew (1989), opposite Kyle Richards.

For much of the 1980s into the 1990s he guest starred in a number of notable television series namely, Family Ties, The Fall Guy, The Love Boat, Hill Street Blues, Newhart, Star Trek: The Next Generation, 21 Jump Street, Seinfeld, Home Improvement, Wings as well as a starring role in the sitcom Room for Two and a major role in The Wave (1981).

In 1985, Putch made his directorial debut with the short film Waiting to Act starring Ed Begley, Jr., Helen Hunt and Lance Guest. He began focusing more on directing in the mid-1990s, directing independent films and episodic television. His television directing credits include Big Bad Beetleborgs, Son of the Beach, Grounded for Life, Scrubs, Ugly Betty, My Name Is Earl, Tycus, Rush Hour, APB, Cougar Town, and American Housewife. Some of Putch's film directing credits include Bachelor Man starring David DeLuise, The Poseidon Adventure, American Pie Presents: The Book of Love, Murder 101: College Can Be Murder starring Dick Van Dyke and Mojave Phone Booth starring Annabeth Gish and Steve Guttenberg, which won numerous independent film awards.

In 2007 Putch began making a trilogy of comedies surrounding US Route 30 in his home state of Pennsylvania.  Route 30, Route 30, Too! and Route 30, Three! respectively take place in south central Pennsylvania in Franklin and Adams counties.

Partial filmography
Jaws 3-D (1983) - Sean Brody
The Sure Thing (1985) - Mastin
Vision Quest 1985 - Uncredited
Waiting to Act (1985) - Tom's Director
Impure Thoughts (1986) - Danny Stubbs
Welcome to 18 (1986) - Cory
Star Trek: The Next Generation (1988, 1989) - Mordock, Mendon
Curfew (1989) - Bob Perkins
Men at Work (1990) - Mike
Skeeter (1993) - Hamilton
Clear and Present Danger (1994) - Blackhawk Co-Pilot
Camp Nowhere (1994) - Neil Garbus
Star Trek Generations (1994) - Journalist #2
Same River Twice (1996) - Skinner
Spoiler (1998) - Doctor
Freedom Strike (1998) - Stanley Shaw
City of Angels (1998) - Man in Car
The Souler Opposite (1998) - Lester
Chain of Command (2000) - Agent Joe Lambert
Mach 2 (2000) - Tim Mandell
Crash Point Zero (2001) - George
The Confidence Man (2001) - Strip Club MC

References

External links

21st-century American male actors
Male actors from Pennsylvania
American male child actors
American male film actors
American male screenwriters
American male television actors
American television directors
Film directors from Pennsylvania
Living people
People from Chambersburg, Pennsylvania
Screenwriters from Pennsylvania
1961 births